Caladenia fuscolutescens, commonly known as the ochre spider orchid, is a species of orchid endemic to the south-west of Western Australia. It has a single, hairy leaf and one or two brownish-yellow flowers with a pale yellow, red-striped labellum. It is most common in spring after bushfires in the previous summer.

Description
The flowers are brownish-yellow and the lateral sepals and petals have long, drooping, brownish, thread-like tips. The sides of the labellum have short, brownish-yellow teeth and the tip of the labellum is curved downwards. There are two rows of anvil-shaped calli along the centre of the labellum. Flowering occurs in September and October, often following bushfires the previous summer.

Taxonomy and naming
Caladenia fuscolutescens was first described in 2001 by Stephen Hopper and Andrew Phillip Brown from a specimen collected near Wellstead and the description was published in Nuytsia. The specific epithet (fuscolutescens) is derived from the Latin words fuscus meaning "dark", "swarthy" or "dusky" and lutescens meaning "becoming yellow", referring to the distinctive colour of the flowers.

Distribution and habitat
Ochre spider orchid occurs between Albany and Wellstead in the Esperance Plains and Jarrah Forest biogeographic regions where it grows in scrub and woodland, usually in sandy soil.

Conservation
Caladenia fuscolutescens  is classified as "not threatened" by the Government of Western Australia Department of Parks and Wildlife.

References

fuscolutescens
Orchids of Western Australia
Endemic orchids of Australia
Plants described in 2001
Endemic flora of Western Australia
Taxa named by Stephen Hopper
Taxa named by Andrew Phillip Brown